Añjali Mudrā, is a hand gesture mainly associated with Indian religions and arts, encountered throughout Asia and beyond. It is a part of Indian classical dance postures such as Bharatanatyam, yoga practice, and forms part of the greeting Namaste. Among the performance arts, Anjali Mudra is a form of non-verbal, visual communication to the audience. It is one of 24 samyukta mudras of the Indian classical arts. There are several forms of the Anjali Mudra such as the brahmanjali.

The gesture is incorporated into many yoga asanas. The modern yoga pose praṇāmāsana involves standing upright, with the hands in Añjali Mudrā.

As a gesture, it is widely used as a sign of respect or a silent greeting in India, Sri Lanka, Nepal, Bhutan, Burma, Thailand, Laos, Cambodia, and Indonesia. It is also used among East Asian Buddhists, Chinese religionists, and Shintoists and adherents of similar Asian traditions. The gesture is used as a part of prayer or for worship in many Indian religions and other Eastern religions. 

In sculpture, the Anjali mudra is common at entrances and in relief works of historic temples such as the Lingobhavamurti of Shaivism. The Anjali mudra differs from Namaste by being a non-verbal gesture, while Namaste can be said with or without any gesture. According to Bhaumik and Govil, the Anjali mudra and Namaskara mudra are very similar but have subtle differences. The back of the thumbs in Anjali mudra face the chest and are perpendicular to other fingers, while the thumbs in Namaskara mudra are aligned with the other fingers.

Etymology
Añjali (अञ्जलि) is a Sanskrit word which refers to the cavity formed between the palms by folding the hands together, to thus hold and offer flowers or water or donate or to receive something. When the hands press together and are raised, it connotes "respect", "reverence", "benediction", "salutation" or a form of "supplication". It is derived from anj, meaning "to honour or celebrate". Anjali connotes a "divine offering", "a gesture of reverence".

Mudra means "seal" or "sign". The meaning of the phrase is thus "salutation seal".

Anjali mudra is described in ancient Indian texts such as in verse 9.127–128 of the Natya Shastra (200 BCE – 200 CE), in temple architecture texts dated after the 6th-century CE such as in verse 5.67 of the Devata murti prakarana, and those on a painting called the Citrasutras. The Natya Shastra, a classical Indian dance text, describes it to be a posture where the two hands are folded together in a reverential state and that this is used to pray before a deity, receive any person one reveres, and also to greet friends. The Natya Shastra further states that for prayers inside a temple, the Anjali mudra should be placed near one's head or above, while meeting someone venerable it is placed in front of one's face or chin, and for friends near one's chest.

The gesture is also known as hrdayanjali mudra meaning "reverence to the heart seal" (from hrd, meaning "heart") and atmanjali mudra meaning "reverence to the self seal" (from atman, meaning "self").

Description

Anjali mudra is performed by pressing the palms of the hands together.  The fingers are together with fingertips pointing up.  The hands are pressed together firmly and evenly.

In the most common form of Anjali mudra, the hands are held at the heart chakra with thumbs resting lightly against the sternum. The gesture may also be performed at the Ajna or brow chakra with thumb tips resting against the "third eye" or at the crown chakra (above the head). In some yoga postures, the hands are placed in Anjali mudra position to one side of the body or behind the back.

Anjali mudra is normally accompanied by a slight bowing of the head.

Symbolic meaning

Anjali mudra has the same meaning as the Sanskrit greeting Namaste and can be performed while saying Namaste or Pranam, or in place of vocalizing the word.

The gesture is used for both greetings and farewells but carries a deeper significance than a simple "hello" or "goodbye". The joining together of the palms is said to provide a connection between the right and left hemispheres of the brain and represents unification. This yoking is symbolic of the practitioner's connection with the divine in all things. The word Namaste is sometimes translated as "I bow to the divinity within you, from the divinity within me."

In Sri Lanka the Sinhalese gesture of welcome incorporates the words "ayubowan" (may you live long) with both hands placed together on the sternum with a slight bow.

Physical benefits
Anjali mudra is performed as part of a physical yoga practice with the aim of achieving several benefits. It is a "centering pose" that, according to practitioners, helps to alleviate mental stress and anxiety, and is therefore used to assist the practitioner in achieving focus and coming into a meditative state.

The physical execution of the pose helps to promote flexibility in the hands, wrists, fingers, and arms.

Use in full-body asanas
While anjali mudra may be performed by itself from any seated or standing posture, the gesture is also incorporated into physical yoga practice as part of many full-body asanas including:

 Anjaneyasana (lunge) – with arms overhead
 Hanumanasana (monkey pose)
 Malasana (garland pose)
 Matsyasana (fish pose) – an advanced variant
 Prasarita Padottanasana (wide-legged forward bend) – an advanced variant with hands behind the back
 Rajakapotasana (Pigeon Pose/King Pigeon Pose) – anjali mudra in Pigeon pose
 Tadasana/samasthiti (mountain pose) – a variant of the pose used during sun salutation sequences
Utkatasana (chair pose, literally "fierce pose"), arms overhead
 Urdhva Hastasana (upward salute/extended mountain pose) – arms overhead
 Virabhadrasana I (warrior I) – arms overhead
 Vrikshasana (tree pose)

See also
Anjali is known as 合掌 in East Asia, pronounced as Gassho in Japanese, hézhǎng in Mandarin, habjang[haptɕaŋ] in Korean and hiệp chưởng in Vietnamese.
List of mudras
Mingalaba
Namaste
Pranāma
Sembah
Sampeah
Wai

References

Mudras
Gestures of respect
Standing asanas